Kambarsky District (Kambarka joros) is an administrative and municipal district (raion), one of the twenty-five in the Udmurt Republic, Russia. It is located in the southeast of the republic. Its administrative center is the town of Kambarka. Population:  21,243 (2002 Census);  The population of Kambarka accounts for 60.9% of the district's total population.

References

Sources

Districts of Udmurtia